CableU was an online subscription-based service that monitors and analyzes cable network performance and programming trends. The website was founded in December 2006 by Gary Lico of CABLEready.  When CABLEready closed in 2013, CableU closed also.

References

External links
CableU.tv website
Cableready Corporation

Mass media companies of the United States
Companies based in Norwalk, Connecticut
Privately held companies based in Connecticut